Indian Run may refer to:

Streams and tributaries
Indian Run (Delaware County, Ohio), a stream
Indian Run (Muskingum River tributary), a stream in Ohio
Indian Run (Little Schuylkill River), a stream in Pennsylvania
Indian Run (Neshannock Creek tributary), a stream in Pennsylvania
Indian Run (Hughes River), a stream in West Virginia

Populated place
Indian Run, Mercer County, Pennsylvania, a populated place

See also

 
 
 Indian Creek (disambiguation)
 Indian Brook (disambiguation)
 Indian River (disambiguation)
 Indian Stream (disambiguation)